Castle Dyke is an Iron Age hill fort situated between Chudleigh and Dawlish in Devon, England. The fort is situated on a Hilltop at approx 140 metres above sea level.

References

Hill forts in Devon